Luj or LUJ may refer to:

 ISO code for the Luna language
 Luj, a region near Dharwas in the Chamba district in Himachal Pradesh, India
 LUJ, IATA airport code for Lusikisiki Airport, South Africa, on List of airports in South Africa